Federico Colombo (born 6 December 1987) is an Italian professional golfer who plays on the European Tour.

Career
Colombo won several junior amateur events in his home country, before taking up a golf scholarship to the University of Arkansas in 2007. He spent a year in Arkansas, but turned professional in late 2008 having reached the final stage of qualifying school for the European Tour. Playing the final stage as his first professional tournament, Colombo finished T29th and earned a place on the European Tour for 2009. After a slow start, making only one cut, Colombo concentrated on the second-tier Challenge Tour, and subsequently played full-time at that level for two further seasons, with a best result of T2nd in the 2010 Kazakhstan Open. In 2011, he recorded eight top ten finishes in 20 events to finish seventh in the rankings and secure a return to the European Tour.

Amateur wins
2003 Italian U-16 Amateur Championship
2005 Italian U-18 Amateur Championship
2006 Italian Boys Championship
2007 Italian U-21 Amateur Championship

Team appearances
Amateur
Jacques Léglise Trophy (representing Continental Europe): 2003
European Boys' Team Championship (representing Italy): 2003 (winners), 2004
European Youths' Team Championship (representing Italy): 2006
Eisenhower Trophy (representing Italy): 2006, 2008
European Amateur Team Championship (representing Italy): 2008

See also
2008 European Tour Qualifying School graduates
2011 Challenge Tour graduates

References

External links
 

Italian male golfers
Arkansas Razorbacks men's golfers
European Tour golfers
Sportspeople from the Province of Monza e Brianza
People from Giussano
1987 births
Living people